InDaily, initially the online subscriber daily news service is of weekly newspaper, The Independent Weekly, replaced the printed version entirely in November 2010. It shares its website with CityMag, a weekly digital magazine which also produces a quarterly print magazine, and SA Life, a monthly print magazine. All are owned by Solstice Media.

The Independent Weekly, established in September 2004, was a weekly independent newspaper published and circulated in Adelaide, capital of South Australia. The newspaper was released on Saturdays.

History 
The newspaper's owners, Solstice Media, is itself "owned by over 100 South Australian investors and also publishes industry magazines including SA Defence Business, the SA Mines and Energy Journal, Place architecture magazine, and the Catholic family newsletter Southern Cross".

The newspaper launched an online subscriber daily news service called InDaily on the anniversary of its first year in operation. In March 2006, The Independent Weekly switched to a tabloid format and moved its release from Sunday to Saturday. The Independent Weekly ceased physical publication in November 2010, and was replaced by InDaily.

Content 
The Independent Weekly featured articles of critical and intellectual substance, especially with regard to local issues, and was a champion of the arts in Adelaide. Publisher Paul Hamra took on the reins as acting editor, changing the structure of the organisation from utilising a full staff of reporters to using contributors and articles sourced from Fairfax, AFP and The Independent. Its international coverage was sourced largely from The Washington Post, the Los Angeles Times and The Independent in London.

Circulation
After the cessation of physical publication, the InDaily newsletter and website remained free to its 30,000 subscribers.

See also 
 List of newspapers in Australia

References

External links

Weekly newspapers published in Australia
Defunct newspapers published in Adelaide